Hinchey is a surname. Notable people with the surname include:

Edward H. Hinchey (1872–1936), Canadian mayor
Ken Hinchey (1912–1994), American businessman and politician
Margaret Hinchey (1870–1944), American suffragist and labor leader
Maurice Hinchey (1938–2017), American politician
Michael Hinchey (born 1969), Irish computer scientist